"Pärlor åt svin" (Pearls before swine) is a song written and composed by Magnus Uggla and Anders Henriksson. It was recorded by Magnus Uggla and released as a single in 2007, topping the Swedish singles chart. The song also appeared on Uggla's 2007 studio album, Pärlor åt svinen.

The song charted at Svensktoppen for seven weeks between 14 October-25 November 2007, peaking at third position.

Charts

References

2007 songs
2007 singles
Magnus Uggla songs
Number-one singles in Sweden
Songs written by Magnus Uggla
Songs written by Anders Henriksson (record producer)
Songs based on the Bible
Swedish-language songs